Slender sedge is a common name for several plants and may refer to:

Carex gracilior, native to California
Carex lasiocarpa